Hàng Trống painting (Vietnamese: Tranh Hàng Trống) is a genre of Vietnamese woodcut painting that originated from the area of Hàng Trống (vi) and Hàng Nón streets in the Old Quarter of Hanoi, Vietnam. In the past, Hang Trong painting was an essential element of the Tết holiday in Hanoi, but today this tradition almost has disappeared and authentic Hang Trong paintings are found only in museums or fine art galleries. However, the art of making Hang Trong paintings is always considered a symbol of traditional culture and aesthetic value of Vietnam.

Themes and making
The common themes in Hang Trong paintings are spiritual and cultural symbols such as the white tiger (hổ trắng) or carp (cá chép), which indicate a stronger influence of Buddhism and Taoism than in Dong Ho painting. However, besides the pictures of worshipping themes, Hang Trong craftsmen also made paintings with folk themes like Dong Ho such as Bịt mắt bắt dê (blind-man's buff), Rồng rắn (following the leader) or Thầy đồ Cóc (the toad scholar) for the decoration of families during the Tết holiday. The aesthetic value in pictures of Hang Trong painting is more urban than in Dong Ho pictures which are made in the countryside and often reflect a farmer's perspective. Some popular pictures of Hang Trong painting are Ngũ hổ (Five Tigers), Lý ngư vọng nguyệt (Carp Looking at the Moon), Tứ bình (Four female musicians) and Tố nữ (Virgin Girl).

In making a Hang Trong painting, the craftsman starts with woodblocks to print black outlines, then draws the details and finally colours the picture in by hand. Because the main part of the process is made by the craftsman's hands, Hang Trong pictures are slightly different from one to another, thus they become more valuable for the fastidious customers in Hanoi. The paper used in making Hang Trong painting is called Xuyến chỉ paper (giấy Xuyến chỉ), which differs from the natural colour paper of Dong Ho painting. Hang Trong craftsmen colourize pictures with pigments, and therefore the tone of Hang Trong paintings is usually bright and attractive with principal colours being pink, blue, green, red and yellow.

Gallery

History
The origin of Hang Trong painting dates back to the 16th century during the reign of the Lê dynasty. Different from the countryside Dong Ho, the manufacturing area of Hang Trong painting is located in the Tiêu Túc (later changed to Thuận Mỹ) district in the very heart of Hanoi which is now the quarter between Hàng Trống, Hàng Nón, Hàng Hòm and Hàng Quạt streets. This was one of the few places where folk paintings were made in Vietnam during the dynastic time. In the past, Hang Trong craftsmen often began to make pictures in the eleventh and twelfth months of the Lunar calendar so that they could meet with the high demand during the Tết holiday when a Hang Trong painting was indispensable for each Hanoi family. For this reason Hang Trong painting, besides Dong Ho, was also called Tết painting (tranh Tết). Hang Trong craftsmen also produced worshipping pictures for Taoist temples and Buddhist pagodas in Hanoi.

Today, the tradition of Hang Trong painting is almost lost. New pictures are rarely produced in Hang Trong anymore because of lack of interest among the younger generations; there remains only one experienced craftsman, Lê Đình Nghiên, who can make Hang Trong paintings. As a result, authentic Hang Trong pictures are found only in museums or fine art gallery. Nevertheless, there are several efforts underway to resurrect this genre of traditional art like propagating Hang Trong paintings in festivals, galleries and transmitting knowledge of making pictures from old craftsmen to young artists.

See also
Dong Ho painting
Kim Hoang painting

References

Vietnamese art
Culture of Hanoi
Vietnamese painting